The rue Alibert is a street in the 10th arrondissement of Paris, in France. It starts at 66 Quai de Jemmapes and ends at 1 Avenue Claude-Vellefaux and 161 Avenue Parmentier after having served the rue Bichat and rue Marie-Louise. The street extends rue Dieu, after crossing the Canal Saint-Martin via the Alibert gateway or via the swing bridge on rue Dieu.

History
Initially a minor dead-end street, it had several names: 'rue Dagouri' (1740), 'rue Notre-Dame', 'ruelle des Postes', and 'impasse St. Louis' because of the proximity of the Hôpital Saint-Louis. A ministerial decision of 28 Vendemiaire year XI (20 October 1802 in the French Republican Calendar) set the minimum width of the street to 10 meters and ordered the street to be extended to the Rue Saint-Maur. 

The opening of the laterally-crossing rue Bichat in 1824 meant that it was no longer a dead-end, and royal order of December 6, 1827 programmed its widening to 15 meters and extension, however this was ultimately never achieved. The street was renamed rue Alibert on January 19, 1840 in homage to Baron Jean-Louis Alibert, assistant physician at the Hôpital Saint-Louis.

On 13 November 2015, it was the site of one of multiple terrorist attacks in Paris, where gunmen opened fire on the 'Le Carillon' bar at No. 18 and the restaurant Le Petit Cambodge at No. 20.

References

This page is a translation of its French equivalent.

November 2015 Paris attacks
Alibert